DYMY (105.5 FM), broadcasting as 105.5 Easy Rock, is a radio station owned by Manila Broadcasting Company through its licensee Cebu Broadcasting Company and operated by Muñoz Broadcasting Concepts. The station's studio and transmitter are located at the 2nd floor, RML Bldg., Burgos St., Bacolod.

History
The station was inaugurated in 1995 as a relay station of Manila-based Showbiz Tsismis under the call letters DYTS. In 2000, it rebranded as Yes FM and adopted a mass-based format. On July 1, 2009, it rebranded as 105.5 Easy Rock and switched to a Soft AC format.

References

Radio stations established in 1993
Adult contemporary radio stations in the Philippines
Radio stations in Bacolod
Easy Rock Network stations